Nakpil is a surname. Notable people with the surname include:

Carmen Guerrero Nakpil (born 1922), Filipino writer and historian
Juan Nakpil (1899–1986), Filipino architect, teacher and community leader
Julio Nakpil (1867–1960), Philippine composer who fought in the Philippine Revolution